Jandavra (Jhandoria) is a minor Indic language of Sindh, Pakistan, and Jodhpur, India.

References

Western Indo-Aryan languages
Languages of Sindh
Languages of Rajasthan